Val Verde County is a county located on the southern Edwards Plateau in the U.S. state of Texas. The 2020 population is 47,586. Its county seat is Del Rio. In 1936, Val Verde County received Recorded Texas Historic Landmark number 5625 to commemorate its founding. Val Verde, which means "green valley", was named for a battle of the American Civil War.  In 1862, soldiers of Sibley's Brigade took part in the Texas invasion of New Mexico Territory, where they captured several artillery pieces at the Battle of Val Verde.  The battle is memorialized both in the name of the county and a small settlement in Milam County. The Del Rio, Texas, micropolitan statistical area includes all of Val Verde County.

History

 First inhabitants were 6,000–10,000 years ago and later came to include Lipan Apache, Coahuiltecan, Jumanos, Tamaulipans and Comanches.
 1590 Spanish explorer Gaspar Castaño de Sosa leads a mining expedition of 170 who pass through Devils Draw. He refers to a stream by the name of Laxas, which is believed Devils River.
 1673 Juan Larios opens a mission school at between Del  Rio and Eagle  Pass.
 1675 Traveling Franciscan priests celebrate Mass at San Felipe Springs.
 1736 Lt. Miguel de la Garza Falcón leads 100 soldiers along the Devils River in pursuit of Apaches.
 1834 James Grant and John Charles Beales establish settlement on San Felipe Creek, which becomes undesirable due to Indian attacks.
 1850s Military bases to protect against Indian attacks include Camp Blake, Camp Hudson and Camp San Felipe.
 1860 Population of 2,874, includes 108 blacks and 1,103 foreign-born.
 1868 San Felipe Del Rio community is established on San Felipe Creek next to Camp San Felipe.
 1869 through 1882 Seminole Negro Indian Scouts (mixed heritage Seminoles with African blood) under John Lapham Bullis, namesake of Camp Bullis,  defend the Texas border against Indian attack.
 1883 Galveston Harrisburg and San Antonio Railway is completed. Frank Qualia establishes Val Verde winery.
 1884 Langtry community established, named after George Langtry (an engineer and foreman), but wrongly said after Lillie Langtry by Judge Roy Bean.
 1885 Val Verde County is organized from Crockett, Kinney, and Pecos counties. Roy Bean elected justice of the peace in Langtry, operating out of the Jersey Lily Saloon and becoming renowned as “the Law West of the Pecos”.
 1886 Juno and Devils  River communities established.
 1888 Comstock community established.
 1889 Norris community established.
 1928 Lake Hamilton Dam complete.
 1904 Lillie Langtry visits the community of Langtry.
 1929 Lake Walk Dam complete.
 1942  Laughlin Field/Laughin Army Air Field opens to train World War II pilots.
 1945  Laughlin Field closes.
 1952  Laughlin Field reopens as Laughlin Air Force Base, and serves as a secret U2 unit.  Major Rudolf Anderson, a U-2 pilot from Laughlin, is the only casualty of the Cuban Missile Crisis.
 1969 Amistad Dam and Reservoir complete. The project cost $78 million.

Geography

Major highways
  U.S. Highway 90
  U.S. Highway 277
  U.S. Highway 377
  State Highway 163
  Loop 79

Adjacent counties and municipios
 Crockett County (north)
 Sutton County (northeast)
 Edwards County (east)
 Kinney County (east)
 Terrell County (west)
 Acuña, Coahuila, Mexico (south)
 Jiménez, Coahuila, Mexico (south)

National protected areas
 Amistad National Recreation Area
 Rio Grande Wild and Scenic River (part)

Demographics

Note: the US Census treats Hispanic/Latino as an ethnic category. This table excludes Latinos from the racial categories and assigns them to a separate category. Hispanics/Latinos can be of any race.

As of the census of 2000, 44,856 people, 14,151 households, and 11,320 families resided in the county. The population density was 14 people per square mile (5/km2). The 16,288 housing units averaged 5 per square mile (2/km2). The racial makeup of the county was 76.36% White, 4.54% African American, 0.68% Native American, 0.55% Asian, 0.05% Pacific Islander, 18.22% from other races, and 2.60% from two or more races. About 75.5% of the population was Hispanic or Latino of any race.

Of the 14,151 households, 42.90% had children under the age of 18 living with them, 62.50% were married couples living together, 13.90% had a female householder with no husband present, and 20.00% were not families. About 17.50% of all households were made up of individuals, and 7.50% had someone living alone who was 65 years of age or older. The average household size was 3.11 and the average family size was 3.55.

In the county, the population was distributed as 32.10% under the age of 18, 9.40% from 18 to 24, 27.90% from 25 to 44, 19.60% from 45 to 64, and 11.00% who were 65 years of age or older.  The median age was 31 years. For every 100 females, there were 97.00 males. For every 100 females age 18 and over, there were 93.20 males.

The median income for a household in the county was $28,376, and for a family was $31,434. Males had a median income of $26,485 versus $18,039 for females. The per capita income for the county was $12,096. About 22.10% of families and 26.10% of the population were below the poverty line, including 33.80% of those under age 18 and 26.40% of them age 65 or over.

Education

School districts include:
 Comstock Independent School District
 Rocksprings Independent School District
 San Felipe-Del Rio Consolidated Independent School District

Sometime prior to 1976 the Comstock district absorbed the Langtry and Pandale common school districts. The former Juno Common School District consolidated into Comstock ISD in 1992. There was formerly a Star Route School on Miers Ranch. In 1964 the school had 13 students.

Southwest Texas Junior College is the designated community college for the county.

The Val Verde County Library in Del Rio serves the county.

Government
Val Verde County government is led by a four-member board of county commissioners, each commissioner representing one of four districts. The county commission appoints a county administrator as chief administrative officer of the county. The chief law-enforcement authority of Val Verde is the Val Verde County Sheriff's Office. Val Verde County Sheriff’s Office. The fire-protection arm of the Val Verde is the Val Verde County Fire Rescue. Val Verde County Fire Rescue.

County commissioners
One county commissioner is elected from each district to serve a 4-year term. Commissioners are chosen in partisan elections by voters from the districts in which they live. The board appoints a county judge to be chief administrative officer of the county, responsible to the commission for the orderly operations of matters within the board's jurisdiction. The current office holders are:
 Val Verde County Judge: Honorable Judge Lewis Owens
 Val Verde County Precinct 1: Martin Wardlaw 
 Val Verde County Precinct 2: Juan Vazquez
 Val Verde County Precinct 3: Robert Beau Nettleton        
 Val Verde County Precinct 4: Gustavo Flores
 Val Verde County Secretary: Elizabeth Ferrino

Politics
Val Verde County has been a longtime swing county, having voted for both Republicans and Democrats throughout its history.

Communities

City
 Del Rio (county seat)

Census-designated places

 Amistad
 Box Canyon
 Cienegas Terrace
 Lake View
 Laughlin Air Force Base
 Val Verde Park

Unincorporated communities
 Comstock
 Juno
 Langtry
 Pandale

Ghost town
 Pumpville

Notable people
 Judge Roy Bean

See also

 List of museums in Central Texas
 List of museums in West Texas
 National Register of Historic Places listings in Val Verde County, Texas
 Recorded Texas Historic Landmarks in Val Verde County

References

External links
 
 Texas Beyond History, Hinds Cave
 Texas Beyond History, Lower Pecos Canyonlands
 "Val Verde County Profile" by the Texas Association of Counties

 
1885 establishments in Texas
Populated places established in 1885
Texas Hill Country
Majority-minority counties in Texas
Hispanic and Latino American culture in Texas